USS Boston (SSN-703), a , was the seventh ship of the United States Navy to be named for Boston, Massachusetts.

History 
The contract to build Boston was awarded to the Electric Boat Division of General Dynamics Corporation in Groton, Connecticut on 10 December 1973 and her keel was laid down on 11 August 1978.  She was launched on 19 April 1980 sponsored by Mrs. Karen Dane Hidalgo (née Jernstedt), wife of the Secretary of the Navy Edward Hidalgo, and commissioned on 30 January 1982, with Captain Jon M. Barr in command.

In 1998 Boston participated in a UNITAS South America deployment.

Decommissioning 
Due to cutbacks in the Defense Budget; Boston, like many of her early Los Angeles-class sisters was not given her mid-life nuclear refueling, and was decommissioned and stricken on 19 November 1999 from the Naval Vessel Register. Ex-Boston entered the Nuclear Powered Ship and Submarine Recycling Program in Bremerton, Washington, on 1 October 2001 and on 19 September 2002 ceased to exist. Her sail and upper rudder were preserved for display at the Buffalo and Erie County Naval & Military Park in Buffalo, New York.

Awards 
Boston was a much-decorated ship. The crew distinguished themselves on numerous occasions by meritorious service and outstanding performance. Awards included the Arleigh Burke Fleet Award and the Marjorie Sterrett Battleship Fund Award, both of which are presented to one ship in the Pacific and one ship in the Atlantic. Her other awards included:

 1983: CINCLANTFLT Golden Anchor Award, Red "E" for Engineering Excellence, Meritorious Unit Commendation
 1984: Battle Efficiency "E" Ribbon, Arleigh Burke Award Nominee for Greatest Improvements in Battle Efficiency, Meritorious Unit Commendation
 1985:	Battle Efficiency "E" Ribbon, Red "E" for Engineering Excellence, Green "C" for Communication Excellence, Silver Anchor Award, Meritorious Unit Commendation
 1986:	Green "C" for Communication Excellence, Red "E" for Engineering Excellence,
 1987:	Yellow "M" for Medical Excellence, CINCLANFLT Silver Anchor Award, CINCLANFLT Golden Anchor Award Runner-up
 1988:	CINCLANFLT Silver Anchor Award
 1989:	CINLANFLT Silver Anchor Award
 1990:	Green "C" for Communication Excellence
 1991:	Supply Blue "E" for Supply Excellence, Meritorious Unit Commendation
 1993:	White Tactical "T" for Tactical Efficiency
 1995:	Battle Efficiency "E" Ribbon, Meritorious Unit Commendation, Arleigh Burke Award for Greatest Improvements in Battle Efficiency
 1996:	Battle Efficiency "E" Ribbon, Meritorious Unit Commendation, Marjorie Sterrett Battleship Fund Award for Most Battle-Ready Ship in Atlantic Fleet
 1997:	Joint Meritorious Unit Commendation, Red "DC" for Damage Control Excellence
 1998:	Red and Green "N" for Navigation Excellence

In popular culture

References

Los Angeles-class submarines
Cold War submarines of the United States
Nuclear submarines of the United States Navy
Ships built in Groton, Connecticut
1980 ships